Decisive Moments in History is a 1927 history book by the Austrian writer Stefan Zweig. It started off with only five miniatures in its first edition and grew to a collection of 14 with later editions. Its first English translation was published in 1940 as The Tide of Fortune: Twelve Historical Miniatures. The miniatures relate historical events that changed the world.

Contents 
  (The World Minute of Waterloo) Napoleon's defeat at the battle of Waterloo.
  (The Elegy of Marienbad). Johann Wolfgang Goethe writes the Marienbad Elegy.
  (The Discovery of Eldorado). An employee of John Sutter discovers gold in Nueva Helvecia, starting the California Gold Rush.
  (Heroic Moment). The mock execution of Fyodor Dostoyevsky.
  (The Fight for the South Pole). Robert Scott and his expedition reach the South Pole to find that Roald Amundsen's team arrived first.
  (Escape to Immortality). Vasco Núñez de Balboa discovers the Pacific Ocean.
  (Conquest of Byzantium). Constantinople, the last remain of the Byzantine empire falls to the Ottomans.
  (Resurrection of Georg Friedrich Händel). Georg Friedrich Händel recovers and writes The Messiah.
  (The Genius of a [single] Night). Rouget de Lisle writes La Marsellaise.
  (The First Word Across the Ocean). Cyrus W. Field establishes the first Trans-Oceanic cable.
  (The Flight to God). An additional act to Leo Tolstoy's The Light Shines in the Darkness.
  (The Sealed Train). Vladimir Ilich Lenin boards a train commissioned by the Central Powers to start the Russian Revolution.
 Cicero (The Head on the Rostrum)
  (Wilson's Failure)

Only the first five miniatures were included in the first edition of the book. The second (German) edition of 1940 added those listed above as numbers 6 through to 12. The last two were added to later German editions but were already part of the first English edition published under the title "The Tide of Fortune: Twelve Historical Miniatures".

References

External links
 

1927 non-fiction books
Austrian books
Works by Stefan Zweig